Solasonine is a glycoalkaloid that is found in Solanum plants of the family Solanaceae. Solasonine is a poisonous chemical compound when used at high levels.  It is a glycoside of solasodine. Glycoalkaloids such as Solasonine have various applications including pharmacology, cancer treatments and even a role as a pesticide.

High levels of glycoalkaloids are  toxic to humans due to their ability to disrupt cell-membrane function. There is a loss of membrane integrity which puts the cell at risk for apoptosis (cell death) due to the ability of any chemical coming into contact with the cell.

Solasonine was one component of the unsuccessful experimental cancer drug candidate Coramsine.

Side Effects 
Although, solasonine has anti-infection properties it has many adverse side effects as a steroidal glycoalkaloid. These side effects include low blood pressure, a decrease in respiratory activity, rapid heart beat etc.  These side effects are the direct result of the cytotoxic properties of solasonine (at high levels) that lead to disrupted cell membranes.

See also 
 Solauricidine

References

External links

Steroidal alkaloids
Alkaloid glycosides
Plant toxins
Steroidal alkaloids found in Solanaceae